The Drum Barracks Civil War Museum, part of Los Angeles' Drum Barracks, is located in Wilmington, California in the last remaining building of what was a 22 building Union Army base. The U-shaped building served as the junior officers' quarters. It interprets the history of the Civil War in California and provides a look at 19th century Wilmington.

Among the museum artifacts are an 1875 Gatling Gun and a life-size likeness of one of the camels from the United States Camel Corps that drew attention to the Base when the Army brought them to the site. Museum staff has sought to use its status as haunted as a means of improving visitation to secure its future.

The museum is operated by the Los Angeles Department of Parks and Recreation with fundraising handled privately. Its founding director was Marge O'Brien. The museum is also part of the Civil War Discovery Trail, which worked with the city of Los Angeles to preserve funding for the museum's director once Susan Ogle had succeeded O'Brien.

References

External links
drumbarracks.org

Museums in Los Angeles
American Civil War sites